Gyretes is a genus of beetles in the family Gyrinidae, containing the following species:.

 Gyretes acuminatus Ochs, 1967
 Gyretes acutangulus Sharp, 1882
 Gyretes agilis Ochs, 1965
 Gyretes alius Ochs, 1964
 Gyretes analis Ochs, 1965
 Gyretes angulosus Ochs, 1963
 Gyretes angustatus Régimbart, 1884
 Gyretes angusticinctus Ochs, 1957
 Gyretes angustipes Ochs, 1965
 Gyretes antonioni Ochs, 1967
 Gyretes apicalis Ochs, 1963
 Gyretes assimilis Ochs, 1953
 Gyretes associandus Ochs, 1965
 Gyretes atricolor Ochs, 1963
 Gyretes audax Ochs, 1965
 Gyretes bahiensis Ochs, 1963
 Gyretes bechynei Ochs, 1980
 Gyretes bidens (Olivier, 1795)
 Gyretes blandulus Ochs, 1964
 Gyretes bohumilae Ochs, 1980
 Gyretes bolivari Régimbart, 1884
 Gyretes boucardi Sharp, 1882
 Gyretes brownei Ochs, 1958
 Gyretes bruchi Ochs, 1929
 Gyretes brunnescens Ochs, 1953
 Gyretes burmeisteri Ochs, 1929
 Gyretes carbonelli Ochs, 1956
 Gyretes carulus Ochs, 1980
 Gyretes celox Ochs, 1965
 Gyretes centralis Régimbart, 1907
 Gyretes ceylonicus Redtenbacher, 1868
 Gyretes ciliatus Ochs, 1958
 Gyretes cinctoides Ochs, 1963
 Gyretes cinctus (Germar, 1824)
 Gyretes cingulatus Ochs, 1965
 Gyretes circellaris Ochs, 1966
 Gyretes clypealis Ochs, 1964
 Gyretes collinus Ochs, 1965
 Gyretes connatus Ochs, 1960
 Gyretes convexior Ochs, 1934
 Gyretes cramptoni Ochs, 1955
 Gyretes cubensis Régimbart, 1884
 Gyretes curtulus Ochs, 1965
 Gyretes dampfi Ochs, 1949
 Gyretes darlingtoni Ochs, 1938
 Gyretes decumanus Ochs, 1965
 Gyretes dentatus Ochs, 1963
 Gyretes dentellus Ochs, 1963
 Gyretes depressus Ochs, 1960
 Gyretes dimorphus Ochs, 1934
 Gyretes discifer Walker, 1859
 Gyretes discus Erichson, 1848
 Gyretes distinctus Sturm, 1843
 Gyretes distinguendus Régimbart, 1907
 Gyretes dorsalis (Brullé, 1838)
 Gyretes dubius Ochs, 1929
 Gyretes duidensis Ochs, 1955
 Gyretes elatior Ochs, 1951
 Gyretes elegans Ochs, 1960
 Gyretes eximius Ochs, 1964
 Gyretes facetus Ochs, 1967
 Gyretes fallaciosus Ochs, 1929
 Gyretes fastidiosus Ochs, 1967
 Gyretes fiebrigi Ochs, 1953
 Gyretes fittkaui Ochs, 1964
 Gyretes franzae Ochs, 1963
 Gyretes fraternus Ochs, 1967
 Gyretes fraudulentus Ochs, 1958
 Gyretes fugax Ochs, 1965
 Gyretes funestus Ochs, 1934
 Gyretes gagatinus Ochs, 1963
 Gyretes geayi Régimbart, 1904
 Gyretes geijskesi Ochs, 1963
 Gyretes geminus Ochs, 1965
 Gyretes gibbosus Ochs, 1953
 Gyretes gibbus Ochs, 1953
 Gyretes giganteus (Piton, 1940)
 Gyretes glabratus Régimbart, 1882
 Gyretes glabricollis Ochs, 1980
 Gyretes glabroides Ochs, 1951
 Gyretes globosus Ochs, 1929
 Gyretes gradualis Régimbart, 1907
 Gyretes grisescens Ochs, 1953
 Gyretes guatemalensis Régimbart, 1884
 Gyretes guianus Ochs, 1955
 Gyretes hastatus (Fabricius, 1801)
 Gyretes henoni Régimbart, 1886
 Gyretes hintoni Balfour-Browne, 1946
 Gyretes hoegei Ochs, 1954
 Gyretes hoffmanni Ochs, 1934
 Gyretes hummelincki Ochs, 1964
 Gyretes ictericus Ochs, 1965
 Gyretes imitatus Ochs, 1958
 Gyretes impiger Ochs, 1965
 Gyretes incommodus Ochs, 1965
 Gyretes inflatus Régimbart, 1892
 Gyretes inlobatus Ochs, 1963
 Gyretes iricolor Young, 1947
 Gyretes jacobi Ochs, 1932
 Gyretes latipes Ochs, 1960
 Gyretes leionotus (Dejean, 1836)
 Gyretes lepidus Ochs, 1965
 Gyretes levis Brullé, 1838
 Gyretes limbalis Régimbart, 1907
 Gyretes limbellus Ochs, 1980
 Gyretes lindemannae Ochs, 1965
 Gyretes lobatus Ochs, 1929
 Gyretes lobifer Ochs, 1964
 Gyretes lojensis Régimbart, 1892
 Gyretes longulus Ochs, 1953
 Gyretes lucidus Ochs, 1929
 Gyretes luctuosus Ochs, 1934
 Gyretes luederwaldti Ochs, 1929
 Gyretes luperus Ochs, 1967
 Gyretes marcuzzii Guignot, 1953
 Gyretes melanarius Aubé, 1838
 Gyretes mendosus Ochs, 1951
 Gyretes mergus Ochs, 1967
 Gyretes meridionalis Régimbart, 1884
 Gyretes mexicanus Régimbart, 1884
 Gyretes minax Ochs, 1967
 Gyretes minor Régimbart, 1884
 Gyretes minusculus Ochs, 1953
 Gyretes molestus Ochs, 1965
 Gyretes morio (Dejean, 1833)
 Gyretes multisetosus Ochs, 1929
 Gyretes mutatus Ochs, 1965
 Gyretes nanulus Ochs, 1964
 Gyretes nevermanni Ochs, 1935
 Gyretes nigrilabris Ochs, 1938
 Gyretes nitidulus Laboulbène, 1853
 Gyretes nothus Ochs, 1980
 Gyretes nubilus Ochs, 1965
 Gyretes nudicollis Ochs, 1964
 Gyretes oberthueri Ochs, 1965
 Gyretes obesus Ochs, 1958
 Gyretes oblongus Régimbart, 1884
 Gyretes ochsi Brinck, 1944
 Gyretes ohausi Ochs, 1951
 Gyretes onerans Ochs, 1965
 Gyretes orinocensis Ochs, 1958
 Gyretes pachysomus Ochs, 1960
 Gyretes palmatus Ochs, 1965
 Gyretes parcior Ochs, 1965
 Gyretes parvulus Laboulbène, 1853
 Gyretes patruelis Ochs, 1956
 Gyretes paulistanus Ochs, 1958
 Gyretes pauxillus Ochs, 1964
 Gyretes pertinax Ochs, 1967
 Gyretes peruvianus Ochs, 1953
 Gyretes pescheti Ochs, 1929
 Gyretes petax Ochs, 1965
 Gyretes pilicollis Ochs, 1965
 Gyretes pipitzi Régimbart, 1892
 Gyretes plagiatus Ochs, 1934
 Gyretes planoides Ochs, 1960
 Gyretes plaumanni Ochs, 1943
 Gyretes procerulus Ochs, 1967
 Gyretes prolongatus Ochs, 1965
 Gyretes proximus Sharp, 1882
 Gyretes puberulus Ochs, 1967
 Gyretes pubicollis Ochs, 1964
 Gyretes pugnax Ochs, 1966
 Gyretes pygidialis Balfour-Browne, 1946
 Gyretes pygmaeolus Ochs, 1963
 Gyretes pygmaeus Régimbart, 1882
 Gyretes rapax Ochs, 1966
 Gyretes rectangulus Ochs, 1967
 Gyretes reginae Ochs, 1960
 Gyretes roraimensis Ochs, 1955
 Gyretes rosalesi Ochs, 1980
 Gyretes sagax Ochs, 1967
 Gyretes sallei Laboulbène, 1853
 Gyretes salvadorensis Ochs, 1952
 Gyretes sattleri Ochs, 1967
 Gyretes scaphidiformis Régimbart, 1882
 Gyretes schubarti Ochs, 1958
 Gyretes scitulus (Dejean, 1833)
 Gyretes scitus Ochs, 1960
 Gyretes sculpturatus Ochs, 1934
 Gyretes sedulus Ochs, 1965
 Gyretes sejugandus Ochs, 1960
 Gyretes separandus Ochs, 1965
 Gyretes sericeus (Dejean, 1833)
 Gyretes sertatus Ochs, 1967
 Gyretes setiger Ochs, 1965
 Gyretes sexualis Régimbart, 1884
 Gyretes sharpi Régimbart, 1884
 Gyretes simpsoni White, 1847
 Gyretes sinuatus LeConte, 1852
 Gyretes siolii Ochs, 1958
 Gyretes sobrinus Ochs, 1965
 Gyretes sodalis Ochs, 1965
 Gyretes speculum Ochs, 1965
 Gyretes strandi Ochs, 1935
 Gyretes strigosus Ochs, 1963
 Gyretes subcordatus Ochs, 1963
 Gyretes submersus Ochs, 1967
 Gyretes subrhomboideus Ochs, 1963
 Gyretes suntheimi Ochs, 1932
 Gyretes surinamensis Ochs, 1958
 Gyretes suturalis Régimbart, 1884
 Gyretes tarsalis Ochs, 1953
 Gyretes tatei Ochs, 1955
 Gyretes tenax Ochs, 1966
 Gyretes terminalis Ochs, 1967
 Gyretes tiriyo Ochs, 1967
 Gyretes torosus Babin, 2004
 Gyretes torrenticola Ochs, 1934
 Gyretes transitus Ochs, 1953
 Gyretes tumidus Régimbart, 1884
 Gyretes unicolor Ochs, 1963
 Gyretes venezuelensis Régimbart, 1884
 Gyretes vicinus Ochs, 1964
 Gyretes villosomarginatus Ochs, 1924
 Gyretes vittatus (Dejean, 1833)
 Gyretes volvulus Ochs, 1980
 Gyretes vorax Ochs, 1966
 Gyretes vulneratus (Dejean, 1836)
 Gyretes yepezi Ochs, 1980
 Gyretes zilchi Ochs, 1952
 Gyretes zimmermanni Ochs, 1929

References

Gyrinidae
Adephaga genera
Taxa named by Gaspard Auguste Brullé